Greta Streimikyte (born 24 August 1995) is a blind Irish Paralympic athlete who competes in 1500 metres events in international level events. She moved to Ireland in 2010 and became an Irish citizen in 2015.

Streimikyte is one of a set of triplets, born prematurely and contracted retinopathy in an incubator at birth.

References

1995 births
Living people
Sportspeople from County Dublin
Paralympic athletes of Ireland
Irish female long-distance runners
Medalists at the World Para Athletics European Championships
Athletes (track and field) at the 2016 Summer Paralympics
Lithuanian emigrants to Ireland